Stanton Township, Nebraska may refer to the following places:

Stanton Township, Antelope County, Nebraska
Stanton Township, Fillmore County, Nebraska

See also

Stanton Township (disambiguation)

Nebraska township disambiguation pages